The Danish Albums Chart is a list of albums ranked by physical and digital sales in Denmark. It is compiled by Nielsen Music Control in association with the Danish branch of the International Federation of the Phonographic Industry (IFPI), and the new number-one album is announced every Thursday at midnight on the official Danish music charts website.

The following are the albums which reached number one in Denmark during the 2020s.

2020

2021

2022

2023

External links
Hitlisten.NU – The official Danish music charts website
danishcharts.dk – Archive of the Danish music charts

Lists of number-one albums in Denmark
Denmark